Tomoxia lineaticollis is a species of beetle in the genus Tomoxia of the family Mordellidae. It was described by Píc in 1933.

References

Beetles described in 1933
Tomoxia